Jan Erik Digernes is a Norwegian former competitive figure skater. He is a three-time Norwegian national champion and competed at multiple European and World Championships. His best placement was 16th at the 1991 European Championships.

Digernes withdrew from the 1992 Winter Olympics in Albertville, France. Prior to the 1994 Winter Olympics in Lillehammer, the Norwegian Olympic Committee announced that skaters aspiring to be selected for Norway would have to finish in the top 12 at the European or World Championships. No skaters were successful, leading Norway to give up its figure skating spots which the host country had received automatically.

Competitive highlights

References 

Norwegian male single skaters
Living people
Year of birth missing (living people)